Jiří Jebavý is a Czech professional ice hockey defenceman who as of the 2021-22 season, plays for HC Stadion Litoměřice of the 1st Czech Republic Hockey League. He previously played for HC Slavia Praha of the Czech Extraliga.

References

Living people
HC Slavia Praha players
1989 births
Czech ice hockey defencemen
BK Havlíčkův Brod players
HC Berounští Medvědi players
HC Stadion Litoměřice players
People from Vrchlabí
Sportspeople from the Hradec Králové Region